Entomoscelis is a genus of leaf beetles in the family Chrysomelidae. There are about 12 described species in Entomoscelis. The genus has a Holarctic distribution. Adults have red elytra with black markings.

Species
These 12 species belong to the genus Entomoscelis:
 Entomoscelis adonidis (Pallas, 1771)
 Entomoscelis adonidis adonidis (Pallas, 1771) – Distribution: from Portugal to Russian Far East and the north-western part of North America (western Canada and western USA); includes the former Entomoscelis americana
 Entomoscelis adonidis caucasica Kippenberg, 2020 – Distribution: Armenia, Georgia, Iran, Russia, Turkey
 Entomoscelis adonidis goliath Abeille de Perrin, 1897 – Distribution: Southeastern Turkey
 Entomoscelis berytensis (Reiche & Saulcy, 1858) – Distribution: Armenia, Turkey, Syria, Lebanon, Israel, Jordan, Iraq, Iran, Egypt (?)
 Entomoscelis cornea Abeille de Perrin, 1897 – Distribution: North Africa, from Morocco to Libya
 Entomoscelis deserticola Lopatin, 1967 – Distribution: China
 Entomoscelis dorsalis (Fabricius, 1777)
 Entomoscelis dorsalis bashkiriae Kippenberg, 2020 – Distribution: Russia (Bashkortostan)
 Entomoscelis dorsalis dorsalis (Fabricius, 1777) – Distribution: Austria, Slovakia, Hungary, Greece (?)
 Entomoscelis dorsalis hammarstroemi Jacobson, 1901 – Distribution: Russia (southern Siberia)
 Entomoscelis dorsalis iranica Kippenberg, 2020 – Distribution: Northern Iran (Tehran Province)
 Entomoscelis dorsalis turkestana Mikhailov, 2020 – Distribution: Kazakhstan
 Entomoscelis erythrocnema Jacobson, 1893 – Distribution: Uzbekistan, Tajikistan, northern Afghanistan
 Entomoscelis nigriventris Daccordi & Yang, 2009 – Distribution: China
 Entomoscelis orientalis Motschulsky, 1860 – Distribution: China
 Entomoscelis pilula Lopatin, 1967 – Distribution: Caucasus and Central Asia
 Entomoscelis pulla Daccordi & Ge, 2009 – Distribution: China
 Entomoscelis rumex Kippenberg, 2020 (replacement name for Entomoscelis rumicis (Fabricius, 1787)) – Distribution: North Africa (Maghreb), Spain (?)
 Entomoscelis sacra (Linnaeus, 1758) – Distribution: Romania, Moldova, North Macedonia, Bulgaria, Greece, Ukraine, Crimea, Russia (Udmurtia), Georgia, Armenia, Turkey, Syria, Israel, Jordan, Iraq, Iran

Formerly included species:
 Entomoscelis americana Brown, 1942 (red turnip beetle): synonym of Entomoscelis adonidis (Pallas, 1771)
 Entomoscelis occidentalis Escalera, 1914: synonym of Entomoscelis cornea Abeille de Perrin, 1897
 Entomoscelis suturalis Weise, 1882: synonym of Entomoscelis sacra (Linnaeus, 1758)

The name Entomoscelis melanostoma (Gmelin, 1790) is considered a nomen dubium.

References

Further reading

External links

 

Chrysomelinae
Chrysomelidae genera
Articles created by Qbugbot
Taxa named by Louis Alexandre Auguste Chevrolat
Beetles of Europe
Beetles of Asia
Beetles of North America
Beetles of North Africa